Ski Chantecler  is a  ski resort  in the Laurentides region of the Canadian province of Quebec, Canada. It is a few minutes away from the town of Sainte-Adèle and one hour north from Montreal.

8 of the  22 trails are lit for night skiing.

The average annual snowfall is 381 cm and snowmaking is 85% over the entire skiable area.

Events scheduled here include the AT & T Classic, Tournée de glisse CIME FM, Tournée sécurité de l'ASSQ, Journée démo casque, etc.

See also

 List of ski areas and resorts in Canada

External links
Ski Chantecler - Official site

Ski areas and resorts in Quebec